Colours of Light is the compilation album of vocal pieces by Yasunori Mitsuda. It was released on August 26, 2009, in Japan by Sleigh Bells. The album is composed of 14 remastered songs from games and soundtracks that he has composed, and one piece from an album of original songs by game music composers.

Track listing

References

External links 
  
 
 Information at Square Enix Music Online

2009 compilation albums
Yasunori Mitsuda albums